Port of Portland may refer to:

 Port of Portland (Maine)
 Port of Portland (Oregon)
 Portland, Victoria, Australia 
 Portland Harbour, south England